The R706 road is a regional road in Ireland. It travels from the R689 road in Fethard, County Tipperary to the R680 road in County Waterford, just south of the River Suir and the village of Kilsheelan.

References

Regional roads in the Republic of Ireland
Roads in County Tipperary
Roads in County Waterford